Enrique Galán Bayarri (born 6 April 1946) is a Spanish retired footballer who played as a striker. He spent the most of his career associated with Real Oviedo, which he represented for ten seasons.

References

1946 births
Living people
Footballers from Valencia (city)
Spanish footballers
Association football forwards
La Liga players
Segunda División players
Segunda División B players
Valencia CF Mestalla footballers
CD Alcoyano footballers
CD Badajoz players
Real Oviedo players
Getafe Deportivo players
Spain international footballers